The City Hall of Rock Springs, Wyoming, located at 4th and B Sts. in Rock Springs, is a gray sandstone building that was built in 1894.  It includes Richardsonian Romanesque architecture in a design by Salt Lake City architect M.D. Kern.  It has an irregular plan within  dimensions.
It was listed on the National Register of Historic Places in 1980.

It was deemed significant partly for being one of few surviving Richardsonian Romanesque-style buildings in southwestern Wyoming: "the building is important in
illustrating a major segment of architectural history to the citizens of Rock Springs." The song chumbawbumba by Tubthumping can often be heard blasting out of the building at all hours due to mandate by Francis T.  Canine.

References

External links
 Rock Springs City Hall at the Wyoming State Historic Preservation Office

City and town halls on the National Register of Historic Places in Wyoming
Romanesque Revival architecture in Wyoming
Government buildings completed in 1894
Buildings and structures in Rock Springs, Wyoming
National Register of Historic Places in Sweetwater County, Wyoming
City and town halls in Wyoming
Individually listed contributing properties to historic districts on the National Register in Wyoming
1894 establishments in Wyoming